This is the list of notable stars in the constellation Volans, sorted by decreasing brightness.

See also 
 List of stars by constellation

References 
 
 
 

List
Volans